Dindica taiwana is a moth of the  family Geometridae. It is found in Taiwan.

The wingspan is 45–57 mm.

References

Moths described in 1914
Pseudoterpnini